Geir Holte (born 3 October 1959) is a Norwegian cross-country skier. He was born in Drammen, and represented the club Hokksund IL. He competed at the 1984 Winter Olympics in Sarajevo. He is the younger brother of cross-country skier Tor Håkon Holte.

Cross-country skiing results
All results are sourced from the International Ski Federation (FIS).

Olympic Games

World Championships

World Cup

Season standings

Team podiums
 1 podium

References

External links

 

1959 births
Living people
Sportspeople from Drammen
Norwegian male cross-country skiers
Olympic cross-country skiers of Norway
Cross-country skiers at the 1984 Winter Olympics